Dolores Lewis Garcia (born 1938) is a Native American potter from Acoma Pueblo, New Mexico, US. She is known for her traditional style. She continues to work at the Acoma Pueblo, producing pottery including the heart-line deer, hoof prints, and other abstract patterns.

Biography 
Garcia was born on the Acoma Pueblo in New Mexico, and is one of nine children born to Acoma potter and matriarch Lucy M. Lewis, who taught many of her children the traditional pottery-making process rooted in their ancient tradition, including potters Anne Lewis Hansen, Mary Lewis Garcia, Emma Lewis Mitchell, Drew Lewis, and Carmel Lewis. Garcia was received her early education (1945 to 1955) in the Albuquerque Public School, where she was reprimanded for speaking her Native language. In 1990 she received a fellowship to the Institute for Advanced Study at Indiana University in Bloomington.

Work 
Utilizing the skills taught by her mother, Garcia engages a traditional style when creating her decorative and utilitarian works. She was the first to use Mimbres designs in her work, which was at the suggestion of Dr. Kenneth M. Chapman from the Museum of New Mexico. Garcia is particularly known for her pottery designs such as the heart-line deer, hoof prints, and other abstract patterns. She and her sister Emma are adamant speakers against the use of commercial castware and artificial pigments, and continue to share their work at the Acoma Pueblo through workshops and demonstrations that are offered to the public.

Her work has been featured in numerous collections including "The Legacy of Generations: Pottery by American Indian Women" and "Seven Families in Pubelo Pottery", exhibited at institutions such as Maxwell Museum of Anthropology and the National Museum of Women in the Arts.

References 

1938 births
Living people
People from Acoma Pueblo
Native American artists
Native American potters
20th-century Native American women
20th-century Native Americans
21st-century Native American women
21st-century Native Americans
Native American women artists
Artists from New Mexico
Women potters